Louis Jacobi (21 April 1836 – 24 September 1910) was a German architect and archaeologist. He is most notable for his 1889 dig in Pompeii and his reconstruction of the Saalburg Roman site - he collaborated on the latter with his son Heinrich Jacobi. He was born and died in Homburg vor der Höhe.

Bibliography (in German) 
 Zum Gedächtnis des am 24. September 1910 verstorbenen Geheimen Baurats Professor Louis Jacobi zu Homburg v. d. Höhe. Lebensbeschreibung und Trauerfeier aus Artikeln der Homburger „Taunusbote“ zusammengestellt, Homburg 1910.
 
 
 Adrian Clemens: Louis Jacobi — Bürger, Architekt und Heimatforscher. Bemerkungen zu seinem 70. Todestag am 24. September 1980, in: Alt-Homburg 1980 Nr. 9, S. 144–145.
 Alfred Biallas: Louis Jacobi 1836–1910, Baumeister und Bürger Homburgs, Ausstellung, Gotisches Haus vom 23. April – 8. Juni 1986, Bad Homburg v. d. H. 1986.
 Friederike Ulbricht, Silke Fiebich: Architektur und Photographie: aus dem Nachlaß Jacobi; eine Reise mit der Kamera; eine Ausstellung in der Bad Homburger Schloßkirche, Bad Homburg v. d. H. 1989.
 Barbara Dölemeyer: Der Baumeister und sein Kaiser. Kaiser Wilhelm II., Louis Jacobi und die Saalburg, in: Hundert Jahre Saalburg. Zabern, Mainz 1997, S. 28–32
 Barbara Dölemeyer: Louis Jacobi und seine Zeit. Homburger Architekt und Bürger - Wiedererbauer der Saalburg (= Mitteilungen des Vereins für Geschichte und Landeskunde zu Bad Homburg vor der Höhe 59). Verein für Geschichte und Landeskunde Bad Homburg, 2010, .
 Ruxandra-Maria Jotzu: Louis Jacobi. Bad Homburg und sein Baumeister, Societäts-Verlag, Frankfurt am Main 2010 

People from Bad Homburg vor der Höhe
1836 births
1910 deaths
19th-century German architects
20th-century German architects
Archaeologists from Hesse
German classical scholars
Classical archaeologists